The Church of the Ascension is a Grade II listed Church of England church in the suburb of Crownhill in Plymouth, Devon. It was designed by the architect Robert Potter and consecrated in 1958.

References

External links
The Church of the Ascension

Church of England church buildings in Devon
Grade II listed churches in Devon
Ascension